This is a partial list of famous people who are members of the First Nations.

A
Aatsista-Mahkan, Blackfoot chief
Abishabis, Cree religious leader
A-ca-oo-mah-ca-ye, Blackfoot chief
Evan Adams, Sliammon actor, doctor and health policy
Mary Kawennatakie Adams, Mohawk basket maker
Agouhanna, chief of Hochelega
David Ahenakew, politician
Freda Ahenakew, author
Frederick Alexcee, Tsimshian-Iroquois woodcarver
Jerry Alfred, musician
Anahareo (Gertrude Bernard), author
Anna Mae Aquash, Mi'kmaq activist
Nathaniel Arcand, actor
Jeannette Armstrong, author, artist and activist
Arron Asham, NHL hockey player
Shawn Atleo, chief
Auoindaon, Wyandot chief

B
James Bartleman, diplomat and author
Francois Beaulieu, northern prospector and guide
Adam Beach, actor
Big Bear, Cree chief
Jackson Beardy, Ayisini painter
Billy-Ray Belcourt, writer
Perry Bellegarde, politician and leader of the Assembly of First Nations
Rykko Bellemare, actor
Kwena Bellemare-Boivin, actress
Rebecca Belmore, Ojibwe conceptual artist
Ethel Blondin-Andrew, politician
Dempsey Bob, Tahltan-Tlingit woodcarver
Columpa Bobb, actor, playwright and poet
Rodney Bobiwash, scholar and activist
Steven Bonspille, Mohawk chief
Milton Born With A Tooth, activist
James Bourque, activist
Joseph Brant, Mohawk leader
Mary Brant, Mohawk leader
T. J. Burke, politician

C
Douglas Cardinal, architect
Harold Cardinal, writer and political leader
Lorne Cardinal, actor
Tantoo Cardinal, actor
Kate Carmack, possible finder of the gold deposits in the Yukon
Nadine Caron, first female First Nations Canadian general surgeon
Dawson Charlie, co-discoverer of gold in the Yukon
Jonathan Cheechoo, ice hockey player
Chief Lady Bird, (aka Nancy King), Chippewa and Potawatomi artist, illustrator, educator and community activist
Byron Chief-Moon, Kainai Nation American-born actor
Matthew Coon Come, former NationalAssembly of First Nations
Harold Crowchild, last surviving Tsuu T'ina veteran of World War II
Crowfoot, Blackfoot chief
Bert Crowfoot, broadcaster and journalist

D
Brian Deer, Tionerahtoken (Mohawk) librarian from Kahnawake, laid the foundation for the Brian Deer Classification System (BDCS)
Demasduit, one of the last Beothuk people
Andy de Jarlis, Métis fiddler
Paul DeVillers, politician
Bonnie Devine, Ojibway conceptual artist
Donnacona, chief of Stadacona site of present-day Quebec City
Armond Duck Chief, country singer-songwriter
Willie Dunn, filmmaker, folk musician, playwright and politician
Jeremy Dutcher, musician
Lillian Dyck, Canadian Senator

E
Georges Erasmus, politician
Ron Evans, politician

F
Gary Farmer (b. 1953), Cayuga actor and filmmaker
Jerry Fontaine, politician
Phil Fontaine, former National Chief of the Assembly of First Nations
Rainbow Sun Francks, Plains Cree actor

G
James Gabriel, Grand Chief of Kanesatake, Quebec
Jonathan Genest-Jourdain, politician
Dan George, actor and Salish chief
Dudley George, protester killed near Camp Ipperwash
Leela Gilday, Dene musician
James Gladstone, Canadian Senator
Michelle Good, writer and lawyer
Graham Greene, Oneida actor
Mary Greyeyes-Reid, first First Nations woman to join the Canadian Forces
Guujaaw, Haida, carver, musician and political activist

H
John Harding (Sha ko hen the tha), chief of Kanesatake, Quebec
Elijah Harper, politician
Rinelle Harper, advocate for victims of violence
Jimmy Herman, actor 
René Highway, dancer and actor
Tomson Highway, playwright, novelist, and children's author
Tom Hogan, Ojibway painter
Kaniehtiio Horn, actress

I
Ilona Verley, Nlaka'pamux drag queen most known for competing in Canada's Drag Race

J
Alex Janvier, Dene Suline-Saulteaux artist
Chief William Jeffrey, Tsimshian hereditary chief, activist and carver
Edward John, political leader
Mary John, Sr., leader of the Dakelh or Carrier people
Pauline Johnson, writer and performer
Dr. Gene Joseph, Wet'suwet'en Nadleh'dena First Nations librarian, founder of the Xwi7xwa Library
Edith Josie, writer

K
Stephen Kakfwi, premier of the Northwest Territories
Tina Keeper, activist, actress and politician
Keish (Skookum Jim Mason), discovered gold in the Yukon
Wab Kinew, musician and broadcaster
Chester Knight, musician

L
Melina Laboucan-Massimo, climate justice advocate
Oscar Lathlin, politician
George Leach, musician
Reggie Leach, ice hockey player
 Mary Leaf, Mohawk artist specializing in basketmaking
Tom Longboat, distance runner
Morley Loon, musician
Loma Lyns (Whitefish Lake Ojibway), musician

M
George Manuel, former national chief of the Assembly of First Nations
Maquinna, chief of the Nuu-chah-nulth
Lee Maracle, poet and author
Leonard Marchand, politician
Donald Marshall, Jr., wrongly convicted of murder
Mungo Martin, Kwakwaka'wakw woodcarver
Matonabbee, Chipewyan hunter and leader
Duncan McCue, journalist
 Deborah McGregor (Whitefish River Ojibway), environmentalist, educator
Claude McKenzie, singer-songwriter
Gerald McMaster, Siksika First Nation-Red Pheasant First Nation artist, author, curator
Henri Membertou, Mi'kmaq leader
Billy Merasty, actor
Gary Merasty, politician
Ovide Mercredi, politician
Mattie Mitchell, Mi’kmaq Chieftain, explorer
Gilbert Monture, honorary chief of the Mohawk tribe
Alwyn Morris, athlete
Norval Morrisseau, Ojibwe artist
Daniel David Moses, poet and playwright
Tara Lee Morin, writer
Will Morin, politician
Ted Moses, politician

N
Nahnebahwequa, Ojibwa spokeswoman and Christian Missionary
Darlene Naponse, filmmaker and writer
David Neel, Kwakwaka'wakw conceptual artist, print-maker and author
Ellen Neel, Kwakwaka'wakw woodcarver
Aaron Nelson-Moody, woodcarver
Sandra Lovelace Nicholas, Canadian Senator
Shelley Niro, New York-born Six Nations of the Grand River Mohawk artist and filmmaker
Ted Nolan, ice hockey player and coach
Nonosbawsut, leader of the Beothuk people
Kaúxuma Núpika, prophetess

O
Kim O'Bomsawin, filmmaker
Alanis Obomsawin, filmmaker
Diane Obomsawin, artist and animator
Daphne Odjig, Odawa-Potawatomi painter
Bernard Ominayak, elected leader of the Lubicon Lake Indian Nation
Joseph Onasakenrat, Mohawk chief of Kanesatake, Quebec
Oronhyatekha, first Aboriginal medical doctor
Helen Betty Osborne, Manitoba woman, kidnapped and murdered

P
Francis Pegahmagabow, sniper, Military Medal winner
Peter Penashue, politician
Tahmoh Penikett, actor
Elizabeth Phillips, Cheam elder, Halq’emeylem specialist
Piapot, leader, diplomat, warrior, horse thief, and spiritualist
Pitikwahanapiwiyin (Poundmaker), Cree chief
Susan Point, Coast Salish artist
Chief Pontiac, Odawa war leader
Gary Potts, former chief of  Temagami First Nation
Gaylord Powless, lacrosse player
Ross Powless, lacrosse player
Carey Price, NHL hockey player
Tommy Prince, war hero
William Prince, singer-songwriter

R
Bill Reid, Haida jeweler, sculptor and artist
 Sandrine Renard, newscaster on the Naked News
Waubgeshig Rice, writer and broadcaster
David A. Robertson, Indigenous graphic novelist and writer
Robbie Robertson, songwriter and guitarist
Carla Robinson, television journalist
Eden Robinson, writer
Eric Robinson, politician

S
Buffy Sainte-Marie, Cree musician
Samian, musician
Gregory Scofield, writer
Alfred Scow, Judge and Hereditary Chief
Bev Sellars, Secwepemc writer and chief
James Sewid, former chief councilor of the Kwakwaka'wakw
Shanawdithit, believed to have been the last surviving member of the Beothuk people
Crystal Shawanda, musician
Shingoose, musician
Jay Silverheels, Mohawk actor best known for performing as The Lone Ranger's companion Tonto
Sheldon Souray, ice hockey player
Ralph Steinhauer, Lieutenant Governor of Alberta
Cree Summer, voice actress

T
Drew Hayden Taylor, playwright and journalist
Gordon Tootoosis, Cree/Stoney actor best known as Albert Golo on North of 60
Walter Patrick Twinn, Canadian Senator
Tecumseh, military leader, War of 1812
Jeff Thomas, photographer
 Dahti Tsetso, Dehcho environmentalist and educator
Arielle Twist, poet

V
Diyet van Lieshout, musician
Roy Henry Vickers, Tsimshian artist
Florent Vollant, Innu singer-songwriter

W
Barbara Wardlaw, interim leader First Peoples National Party of Canada
Frank Whitehead, politician
Joshua Whitehead, writer
Massey Whiteknife, businessman and musician
David B. Williams, Ojibway painter and printmaker
Kona Williams, forensic pathologist
Myron Wolf Child, activist, public speaker and politician

Y 

 Greg Younging, member of the Opsakwayak Cree Nation, editor and expert on First Nations copyright

See also

Aboriginal Canadian personalities
List of Canadian Inuit
List of First Nations leaders
List of Métis people

Notes

 
Lists of indigenous Canadian people
Lists of Canadian people by ethnic or national origin
Lists of people by ethnicity